Carpatair S.A. is a privately owned Romanian charter and former regional airline headquartered in Timișoara.

History 
Carpatair was established in 1999 and started operations in February 1999 in Cluj-Napoca. The present title was adopted in December 1999 when Swiss and Swedish investors took a 49% stake in the company. The airline is owned by Romanian shareholders (51%) and Swiss and Swedish shareholders (49%) The airline is an IATA member since 2006, and has recently successfully received its 5th IOSA (IATA Operational Safety Audit) registration. Carpatair employed 450 staff at March 2007. The current President and Chief Executive of Carpatair is Nicolae Petrov.

Carpatair emerged from the status of insolvency into the one "in reorganization", having continued to offer charter & ACMI solutions. The carrier had filed for Insolvency on 23 January 2014. The statute used was Romanian Law 85/2006, which is very similar to the Chapter 11 status known in the USA, providing the company a special legal status.

Destinations

As of May 2014, Carpatair dissolved most of its route network; it no longer operates in Romania or Moldova. Carpatair operations now consists of ad-hoc and ACMI charters.

From December 2015, Carpatair operated for Adria Airways between Örebro in Sweden and Copenhagen in Denmark, and also under an NJ flight code route between Stockholm Arlanda Airport and Arvidsjaur/Gällivare in Sweden. From March 2016 until June of the same year, they flew under the Adria Airways call sign from Tallinn. During spring and summer 2016 one aircraft flew under contract for Volotea in France and Italy. From July 2016 they operated the route Stavanger - Oslo under contract for Norwegian Air Shuttle, and a number of routes from Brussels Airport on contract from Brussels Airlines. In summer 2016 Carpatair operated one aircraft on a wetlease for LOT Polish Airlines on routes from Warsaw to Amsterdam and Gdańsk. Between April and May 2017, Carpatair operated services between Berlin-Tegel and Prague on behalf of now defunct Air Berlin. During the 2018 summer schedule, one aircraft was wetleased to KLM to operate routes from Amsterdam to Birmingham, Brussels, Edinburgh and Hanover.

Fleet

Current fleet
As of February 2023, the Carpatair fleet consists of the following aircraft:

Retired fleet
Carpatair previously also operated the following types of aircraft:

Incidents and Accidents
 On 2 February 2013, a Carpatair ATR 72–212A operating on behalf of Alitalia experienced a hard landing because of strong gusty wind at Leonardo da Vinci–Fiumicino Airport in Rome while arriving from Pisa. Sixteen people were injured, two seriously, of which one was the co-pilot.

References

External links 

 

Airlines of Romania
Airlines established in 1999
European Regions Airline Association
Romanian brands
Romanian companies established in 1999
Companies based in Timișoara
Charter airlines